The Scheidegg is a mountain summit of the Rigi massif, overlooking Goldau in the canton of Schwyz on its north mountainside, and Gersau and the Gersauerbecken on its south side. The cable car station 160 metres east of it is called Rigi Scheidegg.

The summit is connected by two cable cars, one, the Luftseilbahn Kräbel–Rigi Scheidegg (LKRS), on the north side connecting to the Kräbel station on the Arth-Rigi Bahn (ARB), and another one, the Luftseilbahn Obergschwend–Rigi Burggeist (LORB), on the south side leading down to Obergschwend in the municipality of Gersau. Alternatively it is possible to walk from Scheidegg to Rigi Kaltbad or Rigi Klösterli by a panoramic footpath on the eastern and western mountainside of the Rigi massif. Much of the path uses the trackbed of the former Rigi–Scheidegg railway that once linked Kaltbad and Scheidegg.

The summit of Scheidegg was once the site of a large hotel, built in 1830. The reduction in tourism due to World War I, and the subsequent change in tourism from overnight stays to day trips, resulted in the closure of the hotel and its eventual demolition in 1943/4.

The Cinema Museum in London has rare home movie footage of the town in 1946.

See also
List of mountains of Switzerland accessible by public transport

References

External links

Rigi Scheidegg on Hikr

Mountains of the Alps
Mountains of the canton of Schwyz
Mountains of Switzerland